USS Leedstown may refer to the following ships of the United States Navy:

 , was acquired by the US Navy 6 August 1942 and sunk by German bombers near Algiers 9 November 1942
 , was launched 13 February 1943 and decommissioned 7 March 1946

United States Navy ship names